Eric Nies (born May 23, 1971) is an American former model and reality television personality. He first gained fame as a cast member on MTV's The Real World: New York, before going on to appear on that show's spinoffs and other reality shows, such as The Grind and Confessions of a Teen Idol. Nies revealed on the 2000 special The Real World 10th Anniversary Special that three years into hosting The Grind, a business manager stole a quarter million dollars from him, effectively leaving him destitute and ruining his career, after which he contemplated suicide and developed drug and alcohol addictions.

Appearances
 The Real World: New York (1992)
 The Grind (1992) Host
 Hangin' w/MTV (1992) Host
 Days of Our Lives (1993) Disc Jockey
 Above the Rim (1994) Montrose
 The Brady Bunch Movie (1995) Hip MC
 The Real World Reunion (1995)
 The Real World Vacations: Behind the Scenes (1995)
 The Real World Reunion: Inside Out (1996)
 The Real World You Never Saw (1997)
 Real World/Road Rules Challenge: Road Rules: All-Stars (1998)
 The Real World You Never Saw: Boston + Seattle (1998)
 The Real World: Tenth Anniversary Special (2000) Host
 Real World/Road Rules Challenge: Battle of the Seasons (2002) Co-Host
 Dance Fever (2003)
 The Road to Reality (2003)
 Real World/Road Rules Challenge: Battle of the Sexes (2003)
 RopeSport: Extreme Workout (2003) Host
 RopeSport: Advanced Workout (2003) Host
 RopeSport: Intermediate Workout (2003) Host
 RopeSport: Basic Workout (2003) Host
 Real Hot (2004)
 I Love the '90s (2004)
 Real World/Road Rules Challenge: Battle of the Sexes 2 (2004)
 Celebrity Paranormal Project - Episode: Wooden Lucy (2006)
 The Real World Awards Bash (2008)
 Confessions of a Teen Idol (2009)
 The Real World Homecoming: New York (2021)

References

External links
 Spiritual Work Official Site
 

1971 births
Living people
Male models from New Jersey
Ocean Township High School alumni
People from Ocean Township, Monmouth County, New Jersey
The Real World (TV series) cast members
Sacramento Surge players
The Challenge (TV series) contestants